The Island Storm is an inactive Canadian professional basketball team based in Charlottetown, Prince Edward Island. The team is a charter member of the National Basketball League of Canada that began play in the 2011–12 season. The Storm plays its home games at the Eastlink Centre. Former Vermont Frost Heaves head coach Joe Salerno served as the team's head coach for the first six seasons until he parted ways with the team in May 2017. In 2021, the Storm were granted a one-year leave of absence after they were the last remaining team based in the Maritimes.

History 
The Storm were established in 2011 and made their debut in the inaugural 2011–12 NBL Canada season. It is owned by Prince Edward Island resident Duncan Shaw, who played a major role in founding the league. Initially, it was unclear whether it would be based in the island's cities of Charlottetown or Summerside. However, it was later confirmed that the team would play their home games in Summerside, specifically at the Credit Union Place. NBL Canada president and co-founder Andre Levingston praised the co-owners at the announcement, "We want the right individuals who are going to bring you the very best, because you deserve the very best. That is why we have these two gentlemen here." Comparing Prince Edward Island's low population to the relatively sparsely populated Green Bay, Wisconsin, MacKay said, "We're going to be the Green Bay Packers of basketball."

A name-the-team contest that was sponsored by several newspapers was held to determine the Summerside basketball team's nickname. After receiving more than 400 entries, it was announced that they would be called the "Storm." According to McKay, it was chosen because "it's short, to the point and it has so much opportunity to play on the name and market the team." He also said it worked well through alliteration. The nickname was suggested by 14 people. A contest to determine the Storm's mascot name, sponsored by Basketball PEI and Greco Pizza Restaurant, was held in September 2011.

Home arenas

Originally opened in 1990, the Eastlink Centre is a sports-entertainment arena in Charlottetown, Prince Edward Island, Canada. The arena has a capacity of 4,000 when set up for basketball. The Storm share the arena with the Charlottetown Islanders of the Quebec Major Junior Hockey League.

Players

Current roster

Season-by-season record

References

External links
 

 
National Basketball League of Canada teams
Sport in Charlottetown
Sports teams in Prince Edward Island
Basketball teams in Canada
Basketball teams established in 2011